Agyrta grandimacula is a moth of the subfamily Arctiinae. It was described by Zerny in 1931. It is found in Ecuador.

References

Moths described in 1931
Arctiinae of South America
Fauna of Ecuador